Helicopis gnidus, the gnidus metalmark, is a species of butterfly in the family Riodinidae.

Description
In Helicopis gnidus the uppersides of the wings are mainly black, with a large orange basal area, followed by a broad patch of white. The hindwings have iridescent patches (or "metalmarks") as well as several long tails.

Distribution
This species occurs in the northern countries of South America, mainly in Suriname, Brazil, Peru and Colombia.

Subspecies
H. g. gnidus (Suriname)
H. g. beaulieui Le Moult, 1939
H. g. galatea Stichel, 1919 (Brazil)
H. g. interrupta Le Moult, 1939 (Peru, Brazil, Colombia)
H. g. medialis Schaus & Cockerell, 1923 (Colombia)
H. g. nigrobasalis Aurivillius, 1929 (Brazil)
H. g. obidonus Le Moult, 1939 (Brazil)

References
Funet

External links
Butterflies of America
Neotropical Butterflies

Riodinidae
Taxa named by Johan Christian Fabricius
Butterflies described in 1787